The 2022 Women's EuroHockey Club Trophy will be the 45th edition of the women's Women's EuroHockey Club Trophy, Europe's secondary club field hockey tournament organized by the EHF. It will be held from 15–18 April 2022 at HC Argentia in Cernusco sul Naviglio, Italy.

Teams
The following seven teams will compete for the title:

 Dragons
 East Grinstead
 Lille
 Mannheimer
 Argentia
 Olten
 Sumchanka

HC Victoria of Belarus qualified for the tournament, however the were excluded by the European Hockey Federation as a result of the 2022 Russian invasion of Ukraine.

Results

Preliminary round

Pool A

Pool B

Classification round

Fifth and sixth place

Third and fourth place

Final

Awards

Statistics

Final standings

Top Goalscorers

References

External links
European Hockey Federation
EHF Results Portal

Club Trophy Women
EuroHockey Club Trophy
International women's field hockey competitions hosted by Italy
Women's EuroHockey Club Trophy
EuroHockey Club Trophy
Sport in Lombardy
EuroHockey Club Trophy